The 1971 All-Ireland Senior Football Championship was the 85th staging of the All-Ireland Senior Football Championship, the Gaelic Athletic Association's premier inter-county Gaelic football tournament. The championship began on 25 April 1971 and ended on 26 September 1971.

Kerry entered the championship as the defending champions, however, they were defeated by Cork in the Munster final.

On 26 September 1971, Offaly won the championship following a 1-14 to 2-8 defeat of Galway in the All-Ireland final. This was their first All-Ireland title.

Offaly's Tony McTague was the championship's top scorer with 1-35. Offaly's Eugene Mulligan was the choice for Texaco Footballer of the Year.

Leinster Championship format change

The Second Round returns to Leinster football championship this year.

Results

Connacht Senior Football Championship

Quarter-final

Semi-finals

Finals

Leinster Senior Football Championship

First round

Second round

Quarter-finals

 

Semi-finals

Final

Munster Senior Football Championship

Quarter-finals

Semi-finals

 

Final

Ulster Senior Football Championship

Preliminary round

Quarter-finals

 

Semi-finals

 

Final

All-Ireland Senior Football Championship

Semi-finals

Final

Championship statistics

Miscellaneous

 On 13 June 1971, the Ulster quarter final meeting of Cavan and Monaghan was the first game to be played at Pearse Park, Ballybay in 45 years.
 There were a number of first-time championship meetings;
 The All Ireland semi-final between Offaly and Cork was the first ever championship meeting between the two teams.
 The All-Ireland final between Offaly and Galway was the first to be broadcast in colour by Telefís Éireann. It was also the first ever championship meeting between the two teams.
 By claiming their first championship, Offaly become the 15th team to win the All-Ireland title who the last before Donegal in 1992 to do so.

Top scorers

Overall

Single game

References